The squad listings for the 2018 CONCACAF U-20 Championship. The squads were announced on 29 October 2018.

Upon completion of the group stage, five of the six group winners made alterations to their squad.

Group A

Puerto Rico
Head coach:  Amado Guevara

Saint Vincent and the Grenadines
Head coach: Wade Jackson

Suriname
Head coach: Eugene Verwey

Trinidad and Tobago
Head coach: Russell Latapy

United States
Head coach: Tab Ramos

Replacements:

United States Virgin Islands
Head coach: Joseph Limeburner

Group B

Aruba
Head coach: Marvic Bermúdez

Grenada
Head coach: Jake Rennie

Jamaica
Head coach: Jerome Waite

Mexico
Head coach: Diego Ramírez

Replacements:

Nicaragua
Head coach: Mario Alfaro

Saint Martin
Head coach: Henri Conner

Group C

Antigua and Barbuda
Head coach: George Warner

Belize
Head coach: Phillip Elexious Marin

Cuba
Head coach: Raúl González Triana

Dominican Republic
Head coach: Orlando Capellino

Honduras
Head coach:  Carlos Tábora

Replacements:

Sint Maarten
Head coach: Elvis Albertus

Group D

Canada
Head coach:  Andrew Olivieri

Dominica
Head coach: Rajesh Latchoo

Guadeloupe
Head coach: Moïse Castry

Martinique
Head coach: Julien Certain

Panama
Head coach: Julio Dely Valdés

Replacements:

Saint Kitts and Nevis
Head coach: St.clair Morris

Group E

Barbados
Head coach: Kenville Layne

Bermuda
Head coach: Ray Jones

Costa Rica
Head coach:  Breansse Camacho

Haiti
Head coach: Marc Collat

Saint Lucia
Head coach:  Francis Lastic

Group F

Cayman Islands
Head coach: Ernie Seymour

Curaçao
Head coach: Ludwig Alberto

El Salvador
Head coach: Ernesto Góchez

Replacements:

Guatemala
Head coach: David Gardiner

Guyana
Head coach: Wayne Dover

References

CONCACAF Under-20 Championship squads
squads